NK Podravina is Croatian football club located in the city of Ludbreg. It is named after Podravina, Drava river basin region in Croatia.

Podravina made the round of 16 in the Croatian cup in the 2013–14 season, losing 3–1 to HNK Rijeka.

They are currently playing in the 4.HNL, the Croatian fourth tier.

Honours 
 Treća HNL – East:
Winners (1): 2010–11

References

Football clubs in Croatia
Football clubs in Varaždin County
Association football clubs established in 1919
1919 establishments in Croatia